In September 2014, it was announced by the International Organization for Migration that a ship sank off the Malta coast on September 11, 2014, killing around 500 migrants. There were eleven survivors. The ship left Damietta, Egypt, on September 6 and sank five days later on September 11. Two Palestinian survivors of the wreck accuse the traffickers of intentionally sinking the vessel after the refugees would not agree to transfer to a different ship.

See also
Timeline of the European migrant crisis
Doaa Al Zamel (one of the eleven survivors)

References

Migrant shipwreck
Migrant shipwreck
Immigration to Malta
Maritime incidents in Malta
Transport disasters involving refugees of the Arab Winter (2011–present)

Migrant boat disasters in the Mediterranean Sea